Hyvon Ngetich (born May 12, 1985) is an elite Kenyan marathon runner.

Career highlights 
In 2007 Ngetich completed the Chihuahua Half Marathon and placed second.  In 2008, she won the Puerto de Veracruz Medio Marathon in addition to placing third in the Austin Half Marathon and at the Ottawa Race Weekend 10K race.

2010 was a successful year for Ngetich as she won the Zapopan Half Marathon, the Ciudad-Juarez Marathon, Monterrey Half Marathon, and at the Grand Marathon Pacifico.

In 2011, she won the Santiago Marathon and took second place at the Ciudad-Juarez Marathon and the Dallas White Rock Marathon.

On February 15, 2015, Ngetich competed in the Austin Marathon. She was in the lead until she collapsed approximately fifty meters from the finish line. Despite medical personnel rushing toward her with a wheelchair, Ngetich refused the chair and crawled the last fifty meters on her hands and knees until she crossed the finish line, coming third. Race Director John Conley adjusted Ngetich's purse prize to reflect second place.

Personal bests 
 10K: 32:48 on May 24, 2008, in Ottawa, Canada
 Half Marathon: 1:11:00 on November 28, 2010, in Monterrey, Mexico
 Marathon: 2:34:42 on April 3, 2011, in Santiago, Chile

External links
 Hyvon Ngetich athlete profile on IAAF

References 

Living people
1985 births
Kenyan female long-distance runners